Arlington Stadium is a sports stadium on Arlington Road West, Hailsham, East Sussex. The stadium is mainly used for Stock car racing and was formerly used for motorcycle speedway as the home track for the Eastbourne Eagles.

See also
Eastbourne Eagles

References

Defunct speedway venues in England
Sports venues in East Sussex
Stock car racing venues